ZOOM Erlebniswelt Gelsenkirchen, founded on April 14, 1949, as "Ruhr-Zoo", is one of the most modern zoological gardens in Germany. It was founded on a heavily shelled area in Gelsenkirchen adjacent to a port on the Rhine–Herne Canal. It initially encompassed 15.5 hectares. During its first years, there was a large turnover of animals as an animal trader provided them.

Today the park is owned by the city of Gelsenkirchen via GEW – Gesellschaft für Energie und Wirtschaft mbH (society for energy and business), a holding of municipally owned concerns.

After 2004 the park was enlarged to the present size.

It is incredibly well known for its panoramas and cultural approach. The main attractions are big animals, mostly mammals; the zoo has no aquarium house, insectarium or other facilities for smaller animals.

The numbers before 2005 reflect average visitor numbers for the old Ruhr-Zoo.

Concept and layout

The entrance area resembles the character of a Westphalian farm and is called Grimberger Hof (opened 2004). Its yard offers access to the three separate areas of the park. These are called "safaris" and titled Alaska (opened 2005), Afrika (opened 2006) and Asien (opened 2010).

All Safaris are accessible through gates in a matching style with a shop delivering related paraphernalia.

Grimberger Hof

The entrance area is designed as a farm and features: some rare species of domesticated animals, a restaurant, a playground, a shop for memorabilia and a petting zoo.

Animals 

 Bentheimer Landschaf
 Bielefelder Kennhuhn
  (German improved fawn)
 Danish Protest Pig
 Donkey
 Guinea pig
 Hinterwälder
 Shetland pony

Alaska

It mainly features nearctic ecozone wildlife with the likes of polar bears, mooses and Californian sea lions. It has a tunnel under a water-filled basin and beavers in a landscaped habitat.

The area is decorated with American road signs, a school bus, a cave resembling a gold mine and other touristy features. Additionally, there is another open-air restaurant and a simulator ride with an animated floor gives the illusion of riding an igloo on an ice floe.

Animals 

 North American beaver
 North American porcupine
 Eastern wolf
 Polar bear
 Brown bear
 Eurasian brown bear
 California sea lion
 Raccoon
 Striped skunk
 North American river otter
 Reindeer
 Moose
 Canada goose
 Snowy owl

Africa

This safari features most of the popular big animals from Sub-Saharan Africa. Lions and zebras can be seen within the same panorama. A lake with flamingos, a rocky landscape for monkeys and an area with hippos (which are separated from the visitors using invisible underwater fences) can be traversed via a tow boat ride called the African Queen.

Besides wild animals, the entrance area displays some domesticated forms like Ankole-Watusi.

This area features another open-air restaurant and a big playground.

Animals 

 African domesticated animals: Ankole-Watusi, Somali sheep, West African Dwarf goat
 Bush and tree savannah: Cape porcupine, Transvaal Lion, Spotted hyena, Rothschild's giraffe, Nyala, Bontebok, Impala, Vulturine guineafowl, Double-spurred spurfowl, Spotted thick-knee, Laughing dove, Senegal parrot, Black-cheeked lovebird, Von der Decken's hornbill, Abyssinian ground hornbill
 Grass savannah: Plains zebra, White rhinoceros, Greater kudu, Common eland, Sable antelope, Springbok, Common ostrich, Griffon vulture, Marabou stork
 Wet savannah: Olive Baboon, Meerkat, Hippopotamus, Sitatunga, White-faced whistling duck, Greater flamingo, Lesser flamingo, Great cormorant, Saddle-billed stork, Pink-backed pelican
 Tropical rainforest: Egyptian fruit bat, Senegal bushbaby (since 2007 without breeding), Moustached guenon, Western chimpanzee, Serval, Hamerkop, Grey parrot, Ball python
 Lemur island: Ring-tailed lemur, Red ruffed lemur, Black-and-white ruffed lemur

Asia

Asia features mainly a big hall with tropical climate, home of: orangutans, grey langurs, flying foxes, orchids, palm trees and more. It also includes a big indoor playground and a restaurant with Asian cuisine.

Further attractions are a monkey palace, Bactrian camels and (displayed since summer 2013) Siberian tigers.

Animals 

 Kalong
 Northern plains grey langur
 Southern pig-tailed macaque
 Sumatran orangutan
 Red panda
 Asian small-clawed otter
 Binturong
 Siberian tiger
 Bactrian camel
 Crested partridge
 Demoiselle crane
 Victoria crowned pigeon
 Pied imperial pigeon
 Red-whiskered bulbul
 Red-billed leiothrix
 Java sparrow
 Brahminy starling
 Asian leaf turtle
 Chinese pond turtle
 Amboina box turtle
 Chinese water dragon

Records 

 On 31 March 2020, the hippopotamus Ernie celebrated his 50th birthday. At that age, he is the oldest hippopotamus bull in Germany. Ernie was born in Karlsruhe but has lived in Gelsenkirchen since 1971. The two female hippos Asita and Susi live in the rainforest hall and an area at Africa lake.
 The hippopotamus Rosi, which weighed more than two tons, was the oldest hippopotamus in Germany. She celebrated her 50th in 2008 and lived in ZOOM since 1981. Since then, she gave birth to twelve hippos. On 24 April 2012, Rosi died at the age of 53 years.

References

External links
 
  (in German)

 Zoos in Germany
Gelsenkirchen
 Tourist attractions in North Rhine-Westphalia